Evolutionary Technologies International (ETI) was a company focused on developing database tools and data warehousing. Originally a research project at the Microelectronics and Computer Corporation (MCC) in Austin, Texas, ETI was spun off as a private company by co-founders Katherine Hammer, Robin Curle, Lisa Keeler, and Duane Voth in 1990.

ETI's technology provided a mechanism for automatically generating ETL (Extract/Transform/Load) programs based on user-defined metadata. Their first product was called EXTRACT (later changed to ETI•EXTRACT).

ETI was purchased by Versata in May, 2008.

ETI's technology was acquired by Ignite in June 2015.

References

Information technology companies of the United States
Companies based in Austin, Texas